The Onaqui Mountains are a mountain range in southeastern Tooele County, Utah United States.

Description
The range is part of a continuous range with the Stansbury Mountains and Sheeprock Mountains. The highest point is Stookey Benchmark, which reaches 9,020 feet. Rush Valley is on the east side of the range and Skull Valley is to the west. 

The Bureau of Land Management administers the Onaqui Mountains Herd Management Area, a  home to 450 wild horses. Horses have been in the area since the late 1800s, mostly from local ranch stock. There was concern that genetic variability of the herd was critically low, so horses from other HMAs were added to the herd. The goal was to improve adoptability by selecting for size, color and improved conformation.

See also

 List of mountain ranges of Utah

References

External links

Mountain ranges of Tooele County, Utah
Mountain ranges of the Great Basin
Mountain ranges of Utah